Anthurium cubense is a species of flowering plant in the family Araceae, native to southeastern Mexico, Central America, Cuba, Colombia, and Venezuela. A large species, it is occasionally kept as a hothouse specimen or as a house plant. With Anthurium pendulifolium, it is a parent of the 'BigBill' hybrid cultivar, with leaves exceeding .

References

cubense
Flora of Southeastern Mexico
Flora of Central America
Flora of Cuba
Flora of Colombia
Flora of Venezuela
Plants described in 1898
Flora without expected TNC conservation status